Tyke Peacock (born February 24, 1961) is a retired high jumper from the United States, who is best known for winning the silver medal in the men's high jump event at the inaugural 1983 World Championships. He set his personal best of 2.33 metres in the same event on 1983-08-17 at a meet in Berlin.

He also won the 1981 IAAF World Cup.

References
 
 Sports Illustrated

1961 births
Living people
American male high jumpers
Place of birth missing (living people)
World Athletics Championships medalists